Demonbreun's Cave is a cave in Nashville which is listed on the National Register of Historic Places listings in Davidson County, Tennessee (NRHP) in 1979. The cave was named after a fur trapper named Timothy Demonbreun.

History
There is a large crack in the facade along the Cumberland River which is named for fur trapper Timothy Demonbreun. The cave was originally a home for Demonbreun in an area of Tennessee which was home to the indigenous Chickasaw tribe. He used the cave for a short time because it was near a plethora of Game animals. The cave appears to be a crack in the rocks along the Cumberland River: today there are steel bars across the entrance. It is approximately one mile upriver from Nashville on the right river bank.

The cave was listed on the National Register of Historic Places listings in Davidson County, Tennessee in July of 1979. It was first explored between 1750-1799.

References

External link
Video - Exploring Demonbreun Cave, Nashville's first residence

Natural features on the National Register of Historic Places
National Register of Historic Places in Nashville, Tennessee
Houses on the National Register of Historic Places in Tennessee
Geography of Nashville, Tennessee
Tourist attractions in Tennessee
Tourist attractions in Nashville, Tennessee